The Viana do Castelo Football Association (Associação de Futebol de Viana do Castelo, frequently shortened to AF Viana do Castelo) is the district governing body for the all football competitions in the Portuguese Viana do Castelo District. It is also the regulator of the clubs registered in the district.

Notable clubs in the Viana do Castelo FA
 Clube Atlético de Valdevez
 SC Vianense
 SC Melgacense
 CD Cerveira
 AD Os Limianos

Current Divisions - 2017-18 Season

The AF Viana do Castelo runs the following division covering the fourth and fifth tiers of the Portuguese football league system.

1ª Divisão 

Associação Desportiva de Campos
Associação Desportiva de Chafé 
Associação Desportiva de Ponte da Barca
Associação Desportiva e Cultural da Correlhã
Associação Desportiva Os Limianos
Centro Recreativo e Cultural de Távora
Clube Desportivo de Cerveira 
Desportivo de Monção
Futebol Clube de Vila Franca
Grupo Desportivo de Moreira do Lima
Grupo Desportivo de Vitorino de Piães
Neves Futebol Clube
Sport Clube Valenciano
Sport Clube Vianense
Sporting Clube Courense
União Desportiva de Lanheses

2ª Divisão 

Anais Futebol Clube 
Associação Cultural e Recreativa de Arcozelo
Associação Desportiva Darquense
Associação Desportiva e Cultural Aboim/Sandim
Associação Desportiva e Cultural Fachense
Associação Desportiva e Cultural de Perre
Associação Desportiva e Cultural de Longos Vales 
Associação Recreativa e Cultural de Paçô
Associação Desportiva e Cultural de Perre
Centro Cultural e Desportivo Ancorense
Deucriste Sport Clube 
Grupo Desportivo Castelense
Grupo Desportivo de Bertiandos
Lanhelas Futebol Clube 
Sport Clube Melgacense 
Sport União Cardielense
União Desportiva Moreira
União Desportiva Os Raianos
Vila Fria 1980

See also
 Portuguese District Football Associations
 Portuguese football competitions
 List of football clubs in Portugal

References 

Viana do Castelo
Viana do Castelo District